A regular language is said to be star-free if it can be described by a regular expression constructed from the letters of the alphabet, the empty set symbol, all boolean operators – including complementation – and concatenation but no Kleene star. The condition is equivalent to having generalized star height zero.

Marcel-Paul Schützenberger characterized star-free languages as those with aperiodic syntactic monoids.  They can also be characterized logically as languages definable in FO[<], the first-order logic over the natural numbers with the less-than relation, as the counter-free languages and as languages definable in linear temporal logic.

All star-free languages are in uniform AC0.

See also
Star height
Generalized star height problem
Star height problem

References

 
 

Logic in computer science
Formal languages
Automata (computation)